Fidelma Watpore (born 9 February 1988) is a Papua New Guinean footballer who plays as a goalkeeper for POM FC and the Papua New Guinea women's national team. She was awarded the Golden Glove at the 2014 OFC Women's Nation's Cup. In 2014, Papua New Guinea held 19th-ranked New Zealand to just 3–0, compared to their previous tie when New Zealand had scored 11 goals.

References

1988 births
Living people
Women's association football goalkeepers
Papua New Guinean women's footballers
Papua New Guinea women's international footballers